Since their first match in 2003, 38 players have represented Namibia in One Day Internationals (ODIs). A One Day International is an international cricket match between two representative teams, each having ODI status, as determined by the International Cricket Council (ICC). An ODI differs from Test matches in that the number of overs per team is limited, and that each team has one innings.

Namibia are associate members of the International Cricket Council (ICC). Namibia played their first ODI matches during the 2003 Cricket World Cup after qualifying by reaching the final of the 2001 ICC Trophy. At the World Cup, Namibia played in six One Day internationals (the ICC granted ODI status to all matches played at this competition). Namibia were defeated in each of their six matches; their best result came in a 55 run loss to England. These were the only ODI matches played by Namibia until they gained ODI status after reaching the final of the 2019 ICC World Cricket League Division Two.

Key

Players
Statistics are correct as of 25 February 2023.

Notes

See also 
List of Namibia Twenty20 International cricketers

References

External links 
Howstat

ODI
Namibia